KNAF (910 AM) is a radio station broadcasting a country music format. Licensed to Fredericksburg, Texas, United States, the station serves the Kerrville-Fredericksburg area.  The station is currently owned by J. & J. Fritz Media, Ltd.

References

External links

Country radio stations in the United States
NAF
Radio stations established in 1983